Sebastian August Schüszler (born August 23, 1994 in Stockholm) is a retired Swedish basketball player who last played for Blackeberg Basket of the Swedish 2nd tier division Basketettan.
He stands 204 cm tall.

References

1994 births
Living people
KK Pärnu players
Rapla KK players
Solna Vikings players
Swedish men's basketball players
Swedish people of Estonian descent
Swedish people of Hungarian descent
Sportspeople from Stockholm